CTV Sci-Fi Channel is a Canadian English language discretionary specialty channel owned by Bell Media. The channel primarily broadcasts speculative fiction and related programming.

The network was launched on October 17, 1997 as Space under its original parent company CHUM Limited. Its slogan, The Imagination Station, continued to be used informally by its fans for several years after its retirement. In 2007, Space was acquired by CTVglobemedia, after acquiring CHUM Limited, while the Citytv stations were sold to Rogers Media. The channel adopted its current name in 2019.

History 

The channel was licensed by the Canadian Radio-television and Telecommunications Commission (CRTC) in 1996. It debuted on October 17, 1997 at 6:00 p.m. ET (3:00 p.m. PT), as Space: The Imagination Station, launching under the ownership of CHUM Limited, airing the film Forbidden Planet, followed by a commentary on that film by author Robert J. Sawyer, followed by the film Mars Attacks!. The Sawyer commentary was the first example of the interstitial materials — mostly produced by Mark Askwith — that became SPACE's signature: short, snappy, mini-documentaries on science fiction and science topics shown between programs, collectively known as "SPACE Flow".  Daily installments include Space News (formerly SPIN, for "Space Information and News").

CTVglobemedia took over Space on June 22, 2007, as a result of a takeover of CHUM Limited. At the same time, the Citytv stations were sold to Rogers later that year. Ownership changed hands once again when on April 1, 2011, BCE Inc. gained 100% control of CTVglobemedia's non-publishing assets that it did not already own, placing Space under the ownership of Bell Media.

On February 8, 2011, the Reeves-Stevenses submitted a letter to the Canadian Radio-television and Telecommunications Commission (CRTC) in support of an application by CTVglobemedia to renew the broadcasting license of Space.

On July 6, 2011, a high definition simulcast of Space was launched. It is available through all major television providers in Canada.

On March 4, 2013, Space introduced a new logo to coincide with the premiere of the channel's new original co-production Orphan Black. A Bell Media executive explained that the branding was designed to reflect upon the broadening of the sci-fi genre beyond outer space and "people in polyester onesies running around with taser guns", by portraying the new logo in the form of real-life objects with a "phenomenal twist" to symbolize the "space around you". Through Bell Media's acquisition of Astral Media, Space is now co-owned with the French-language science-fiction channel, Ztélé (since renamed Z).

On June 7, 2018, it was announced that Space would be rebranded as "CTV Sci-Fi", as part of a re-alignment of several Bell Media specialty channels under the CTV brand. The following year, it was revealed the channel would instead rebrand as CTV Sci-Fi Channel on September 12, 2019.

Programming 
CTV Sci-Fi Channel's programming includes scripted television series and films primarily focused on the science fiction, fantasy, superhero fiction, horror, and paranormal genres, often in a marathon format outside of prime time. The channel's original programming has included in-studio shows (including the daily newsmagazine Innerspace), scripted dramas, as well as shows co-produced with the U.S. channel Syfy, from which the channel also acquires the bulk of its programming.

The channel holds the linear television rights to the Star Trek television franchise in Canada, holding library rights to past Star Trek television seasons and movies, and having acquired the rights to newer Star Trek seasons, Star Trek: Discovery, produced for the Paramount+ streaming service.

Current programming

Original
 SurrealEstate (2021)

Acquired

 Andromeda
 The Ark
 Doctor Who
 Doom Patrol
 Face Off
 Legends of Tomorrow
 Pandora
 Raised by Wolves
 Resident Alien
 Superman & Lois
 Stargate Atlantis
 Stargate SG-1
 Star Trek
 Star Trek: Deep Space Nine
 Star Trek: Discovery
 Star Trek: Enterprise
 Star Trek: Lower Decks
 Star Trek: Picard
 Star Trek: Prodigy
 Star Trek: The Next Generation
 Star Trek: Voyager
 Star Trek: Strange New Worlds
 The Twilight Zone
 Urban Legend
 Xena: Warrior Princess

Upcoming programming

Original
 Paranormal Revenge (TBA)

Former programming

Original

 Aftermath
 Astrid and Lilly Save the World
 Behind the Scenes
 Being Human
 Bitten
 Charlie Jade
 The Conspiracy Guy
 Dark Matter
 Fanboy Confessional
 The Girly Ghosthunters
 Grand Star
 HypaSpace
 Innerspace
 Killjoys
 Orphan Black
 Primeval: New World
 Rabbit Fall
 Shadow Hunter
 Shelf Space
 The SpaceBar
 Space Interstitials
 SpaceNews
 Space Top 10 Countdown
 Steve Smith Playhouse
 Stormworld
 Todd & The Book of Pure Evil
 Tripping the Rift
 Unexplained Canada
 Wynonna Earp

Acquired

 The 4400
 Arrow
 Babylon 5
 Battlestar Galactica
 Being Human
 Beyond
 Blood Ties
 Captain Star (2005–2006)
 Cosplay Melee
 Dark Angel
 Dark Matters: Twisted But True
 Dead Set
 Deadly Class
 Defying Gravity
 The Deep
 Do No Harm
 Enigma
 The Expanse
 Farscape
 Firefly
 The Following
 Ghost Mine
 Grimm
 Hex
 Hilarious House of Frightenstein
 Krypton
 Lost
 The Lost Room
 Lost in Space
 Manimal
 Medium
 Merlin
 Mutant X
 Night Stalker
 Paranormal Witness
 Perversions of Science
 Primeval
 Prisoners of Gravity
 Quantum Leap
 Relic Hunter
 Ripper Street
 Roar (US series)
 Robot Combat League
 Robotech
 Sanctuary
 The Sentinel
 Smallville
 Space Precinct
 Supernatural
 Stan Against Evil
 Stargate Universe
 Surface
 Terminator: The Sarah Connor Chronicles
 Total Blackout
 The Dresden Files
 The Outer Limits
 The Triangle
 The Secret Adventures of Jules Verne
 Threshold
 Total Recall 2070
 True Blood
 Utopia
 Voyage to the Bottom of the Sea
 War of the Worlds
 The X-Files
 Z Nation

Former Annual events
 The Spacey Awards: Space previously presented its own awards called the Spacey Awards to the best in sci-fi, fantasy and horror films, TV series, and video games. Some of the awards are voted on by viewers and the others by Space.
 Santa Claus Conquers the Martians: Aired for several years at Christmas.
 The Twelve Days of Space-mas: Twelve days of marathons, either of popular Space programs or of similarly themed science-fiction or fantasy movies. This usually includes the Doctor Who Christmas Special on Christmas Day.

References

External links
 

Television channels and stations established in 1997
 
CTV Television Network
Science fiction television channels
English-language television stations in Canada
1997 establishments in Canada
Bell Media networks
Analog cable television networks in Canada